Gomphoneis elegans is a species of diatoms in the family Gomphonemataceae.

References 

 Gomphoneis elegans at WoRMS

Cymbellales
Species described in 1894